Xiongguanlong ("Grand Pass dragon") is a genus of megalosauroid dinosaur that lived in the Early Cretaceous of what is now China. The type species is X. baimoensis, described online in 2009 by a group of researchers from China and the United States, and formally published in January 2009. The genus name refers to the city of Jiayuguan, a city in northwestern China. The specific name is derived from bai mo, "white ghost", after the "white ghost castle", a rock formation near the fossil site. The fossils include a skull, vertebrae, a right ilium and the right femur. The rocks it was found in are from the Xiagou Formation which preserves fossils from the late Aptian stage.

Description

Xiongguanlong was a bipedal animal which balanced its body with a long tail, like most other theropods. The vertebrae were more robust than in other basal tyrannosauroids, possibly to better support a big skull which had a long muzzle resembling that of Alioramus.

Phylogeny

 
The describers concluded that Xiongguanlong split off from the main branch of the Tyrannosauroidea before Appalachiosaurus, being the sister taxon of a clade consisting of Appalachiosaurus and the Tyrannosauridae. It has been found to be closely related to Alectrosaurus.

Below is a cladogram by Loewen et al. in 2013 including most tyrannosauroid species.

See also

 Timeline of tyrannosaur research

References

External links
 "Ancestor of T rex found in China" BBC News
 "Fossil evidence of a goldilocks tyrannosaur" ScienceNews.org

Early Cretaceous dinosaurs of Asia
Tyrannosaurs
Fossil taxa described in 2009
Taxa named by Mark Norell
Paleontology in Gansu